Torben Jørgensen is a Danish epidemiologist. He was awarded the Marie og August Krogh Prisen in 2016. Jørgensen has published more than 500 scientific articles.

References

Year of birth missing (living people)
Living people
Danish epidemiologists